Pärnu JK Vaprus is a football club based in Pärnu, Estonia, that competes in the Meistriliiga, the top flight of Estonian football. The club's home ground is Pärnu Rannastaadion.

History
Vaprus was formed in May 1922, as Sporting Society Vaprus. Among other sports Vaprus competed in the local Pärnu football championships, winning in 1927 and 1934. In 1937, Vaprus merged with several other local sporting clubs to form Pärnu Kalev.

The club was re-established in 1999 as an amateur team playing in the lower leagues. In 2003, several local clubs merged with Vaprus, including former top league club Pärnu Levadia, forming a working football club.

Vaprus won the 2005 Esiliiga season and was, for the first time in the club's history, promoted to Estonia's top-flight football league Meistriliiga. The club finished their first Meistriliiga season in 7th place. Vaprus finished the 2008 Meistriliiga season in 10th place, but managed to avoid direct relegation due to disbandment of TVMK. However, the club was still relegated after losing the relegation play-offs against Paide Linnameeskond.

In 2010, Vaprus formed a united team Pärnu Linnameeskond with Pärnu JK and Pärnu Kalev. Vaprus itself continued to only operate in youth football until 2014, when they entered their senior team to Estonian lower leagues. Pärnu Linnameeskond reached Estonian top flight in 2015, but broke up after two seasons with Pärnu Vaprus inheriting their league spot for 2017.

After an eight year absence, Vaprus returned to top-flight football and moved to the newly renovated 1,501 seater Pärnu Rannastaadion. The club finished the season in last place, but managed to avoid relegation due to Sillamäe Kalev's bankruptcy. Pärnu Vaprus was relegated in the following 2018 season. Vaprus won Esiliiga in 2020, and returned to Meistriliiga, where they again finished last in the 2021 season. However, the club again avoided relegation due to Viljandi Tulevik leaving top-flight football for financial reasons. Pärnu Vaprus finished the 2022 season in 10th place, but once again, avoided relegation due to TJK Legion leaving top-flight football for financial difficulties.

Honours
 Esiliiga
 Winners (1): 2005, 2020
 II Liiga
 Winners (1): 2004
 III Liiga
 Winners (1): 2000

Players

First-team squad

For season transfers, see transfers summer 2022 and transfers winter 2022–23.

Reserves and academy

Kit manufacturers and shirt sponsors

Personnel

Current technical staff

Managerial history

Seasons and statistics

References

External links
 Official website 
Team (2020–) at Estonian Football Association
Team (2001–2019) at Estonian Football Association

Pärnu JK Vaprus
Football clubs in Estonia
Meistriliiga clubs
Sport in Pärnu
Association football clubs established in 1922
1922 establishments in Estonia